Lynda Joy Schlegel Culver (born May 28, 1969) is an American politician from the Commonwealth of Pennsylvania. A member of the Republican Party, she is currently a member of the Pennsylvania State Senate, representing the 27th District since 2023, following her win in a special election. She was also a member of the Pennsylvania House of Representatives, representing the 108th District from 2011 until 2023.

Early life and education
Culver was born on May 28, 1969, in Sunbury, Pennsylvania. She graduated from Shikellamy High School in 1987, and earned a Bachelor of Arts degree in political science from Bloomsburg University of Pennsylvania in 1991.

Political career

Pennsylvania House of Representatives 
Culver first ran for the Pennsylvania House of Representatives from the 108th District in 2010 and won. She was later reelected to six more consecutive terms.

Pennsylvania State Senate 
In 2022, Culver announced her candidacy in the 2023 special election to fill the 27th District seat vacated by the resignation of State Senator John Gordner. She won the election held on January 31, defeating Democrat Patricia Lawton with a landslide 70%-30% victory. She was sworn into the Senate on February 28, 2023.

Personal life
Culver resides in Rockefeller Township, Pennsylvania, with her husband Thomas and their son.

References

External links

Living people
Republican Party members of the Pennsylvania House of Representatives
Women state legislators in Pennsylvania
21st-century American politicians
21st-century American women politicians
1969 births
Republican Party Pennsylvania state senators
Bloomsburg University of Pennsylvania alumni
People from Northumberland County, Pennsylvania